Somalis in Kenya are citizens and residents of Kenya who are of Somali ethnic descent. They have historically inhabited the North Eastern Province, previously called the Northern Frontier District, which was carved out of the Jubaland region of present-day southern Somalia during the colonial period. Following the civil war in Somalia that broke out in 1991, many Somalis sought asylum in the Somali-inhabited enclaves of Kenya. An entrepreneurial community, they established themselves in the business sector, particularly in the Nairobi suburb of Eastleigh.

Population
According to the 2019 Kenya census, approximately 2,780,502 ethnic Somalis live in Kenya. Among these individuals are a number of ethnically Somali international migrants, around 300,000 of whom inhabit the wider East and South Africa regions. These ethnic Somalis are distinct from the Bantus and other minorities of Somalia, who according to USAID constitute most of the estimated 413,170 refugees from Somalia in Kenya.

History

Somalis in Kenya, being Cushitic peoples, were possibly among the first to have arrived in Kenya, long before the Bantu expansion. They have historically inhabited the North Eastern Province, previously called the Northern Frontier District (NFD). The NFD came into being in 1925, when it was carved out of the Somalia. At the time under British colonial administration, the northern half of Jubaland was ceded to Italy as a reward for the Italians' support of the Allies during World War I. Britain retained control of the southern half of the territory, which was later called the Northern Frontier District.

On 26 June 1960, four days before granting British Somaliland independence, the British government declared that all Somali-inhabited areas of East Africa should be unified in one administrative region. However, after the dissolution of the former British colonies in the region, Britain granted administration of the Northern Frontier District to Kenyan nationalists. This was despite an informal plebiscite demonstrating the overwhelming desire of the Somalis in Kenya population to join the newly formed Somali Republic, and the fact that the NFD was almost exclusively inhabited by ethnic Somalis. Nonetheless, the Somali residents had by then successfully lobbied for a separate classification from the adjacent Bantu and Nilotic populations. In the 1962 British Kenya census, the Somali expatriates were accorded their own "Somali" entry separate from the "African", "Arab", "Asian" and "European" designations.

On the eve of Kenya's independence in August 1963, British officials belatedly realized that the new Kenyan regime was not willing to give up the Somali-inhabited areas it had just been granted administration of. Led by the Northern Province People's Progressive Party (NPPPP), Somalis in the NFD vigorously sought union with their kin in the Somali Republic to the north. In response, the Kenyan government enacted a number of repressive measures designed to frustrate their efforts in what came to be known as the Shifta War. Although the conflict ended in a cease-fire, Somalis in the region still identify and maintain close ties with their brethren in Somalia. They have traditionally married within their own community and formed a cohesive ethnic network.

Following the civil war in Somalia that broke out in 1991, many Somalis sought asylum in the Somali-inhabited enclaves in Kenya. An entrepreneurial community, they established themselves in the business sector, investing over $1.5 billion in Eastleigh alone. Starting in late 2012, a mass exodus of Somali residents was reported after a prolonged period of harassment by the Kenyan police and public. Hundreds of Somali entrepreneurs withdrew between Sh10 to Sh40 billion from their bank accounts, with the intention of reinvesting most of that money back home in Somalia. The collective departures most affected Eastleigh's real estate sector, as landlords struggled to find Kenyans able to afford the high rates of the apartments and shops vacated by the Somalis.

See also
Somali diaspora

References

Further reading

)

External links

Kenya
Ethnic groups in Kenya